Fredric Jonson (born 15 July 1987) is a former Swedish footballer who played as a defender.

Career
Jonson began his professional career in 2005 with Swedish club IFK Sollentuna appearing in 24 matches and scoring 3 goals. In 2006, he was transferred to Vasalund/Essinge IF which then played in Division 1. Prior to joining Vasalund he had a trial spell with Benfica. With his new club he quickly established himself as a starter, initially playing primarily at right back, and later converting to center back. In 2009, he appeared in 29 matches, playing a full 90 in all appearances. With Vasalund/Essinge IF and Vasalunds IF he appeared in 86 league matches, scoring 2 goals.

During the 2010 off-season Jonson went on trial with New York Red Bulls but the club did not sign him.

References

External links

Everysport profile
Elite Prospects profile

1987 births
Living people
Swedish footballers
GIF Sundsvall players
Vasalunds IF players
IF Brommapojkarna players
Association football defenders
Footballers from Stockholm